N-Cyclohexyl-2-pyrrolidone or CHP is a yellow to colorless liquid. It has a low vapor pressure, and is nearly odorless. It has a low solubility in water, but is soluble in a variety of organic solvents.

CHP is used in the electronics industry as a photoresist stripper (usually in combination with other solvents like N-methyl-2-pyrrolidone), and as a chemical polisher of copper in circuit board fabrication. It is also used in the textiles industry as a dye carrier in aramid fabrics.

References

Pyrrolidones